"The Clouds" is a 1959 instrumental by The Spacemen, an instrumental studio group.  The single released on the Alton label, was the only chart hit by The Spacemen.  "The Clouds" hit number one on the R&B chart for three non consecutive weeks, and also peaked at number forty-one on the Hot 100.

References

1959 singles
1950s instrumentals
1959 songs
Song articles with missing songwriters